The following highways are numbered 438:

Canada
Newfoundland and Labrador Route 438

Japan
 Japan National Route 438

United States 
  Florida State Road 438
  Iowa Highway 438
  Louisiana Highway 438
  Maryland Route 438
  New York State Route 438
  Pennsylvania Route 438
  Puerto Rico Highway 438